FC Idel Kazan was a Russian football team from Kazan. It played professionally in the Russian Second Division for one season in 1992.

External links
  Team history at KLISF

Association football clubs established in 1992
Association football clubs disestablished in 1993
Defunct football clubs in Russia
Sport in Kazan
1992 establishments in Russia
1993 disestablishments in Russia